Bicyclus medontias, the white-line bush brown, is a butterfly in the family Nymphalidae. It is found in Nigeria, Cameroon, Bioko, São Tomé and Príncipe, Gabon, the Republic of the Congo, the Central African Republic and the Democratic Republic of the Congo. The habitat consists of forests, including somewhat degraded forests.

References

Seitz, A. Die Gross-Schmetterlinge der Erde 13: Die Afrikanischen Tagfalter. Plate XIII 26

Elymniini
Butterflies described in 1873
Butterflies of Africa
Taxa named by William Chapman Hewitson